Mobbly Bayou Preserve is a  county preserve located at the north end of upper Tampa Bay in the city of Oldsmar in Pinellas County in the U.S. state of Florida. The preserve encompasses a wide diversity of upland and coastal plant communities. The preserve is managed through an interlocal agreement with the city of Oldsmar, which is responsible for managing two recreational areas.

Upland, intertidal, and subtidal communities in the bayou have suffered significant environmental distress due to dense urbanization. Approximately  are targeted for restoration and enhancement of coastal communities using the Southwest Florida Water Management District, Pinellas County, and City of Oldsmar Parks and Recreation Department. Two major goals are to restore the bayou's tidal creek system's hydrology and enhance the degraded vegetation communities by removing exotic species and planting native species.

Features
 Canoe launch
 Janice Miller Bark Park Dog park
 Lynn Rives Environmental Education Center
 Fishing dock
 Free parking
 Lookout towers
 Playground
 Restrooms
 Shelters
 Trails
 Zip Line

Gallery

References

Nature reserves in Florida
Protected areas of Pinellas County, Florida